The 1827 Maine gubernatorial election took place on September 10, 1827. Incumbent Democratic-Republican Governor Enoch Lincoln won re-election to a second term.

Results

References

Gubernatorial
1827
Maine
September 1827 events